

Werner von Bercken (8 February 1897  – 29 February 1976) was a general in the Wehrmacht of Nazi Germany during World War II who commanded several divisions. He was a recipient of the Knight's Cross of the Iron Cross. Bercken surrendered to the Red Army on 28 April 1945 in the Vistula Spit. Convicted as a war criminal in the Soviet Union, he was held until 10 October 1955.

Awards and decorations
 Iron Cross (1914)  2nd Class (12 March 1915) & 1st Class (7 November 1916)
 Wound Badge (1914) in White (29 December 1918)
 Honour Cross of the World War 1914/1918 (1 January 1935)
 Wehrmacht Long Service Award 2nd Class (2 October 1936)
 Clasp to the Iron Cross (1939)  2nd Class (24 October 1939) & 1st Class (25 June 1941)
 Eastern Front Medal (4 August 1942)
 German Cross in Gold on 1 June 1944 as Generalmajor and commander of 102. Infanterie-Division
 Knight's Cross of the Iron Cross on 23 October 1944 as Generalleutnant and commander of 102. Infanterie-Division

References

Citations

Bibliography

 
 
 

1897 births
1976 deaths
People from Opole
People from the Province of Silesia
German Army personnel of World War I
Prussian Army personnel
Recipients of the clasp to the Iron Cross, 1st class
Recipients of the Gold German Cross
Recipients of the Knight's Cross of the Iron Cross
German prisoners of war in World War II held by the Soviet Union
Lieutenant generals of the German Army (Wehrmacht)
Reichswehr personnel